Kovalchick Convention and Athletic Complex is a sports and entertainment complex owned by the Indiana University of Pennsylvania in Indiana, Pennsylvania.

The Kovalchick Convention and Athletic Complex, located along Wayne Avenue adjacent to the Indiana University of Pennsylvania campus, is a one hundred forty eight thousand five hundred (148,500) square-foot facility that will offer multi-use adaptable space in the five thousand (6,000) seat Ed Fry Arena, the six hundred fifty (650) seat Christine Toretti Auditorium, the seventeen thousand (17,000) square-foot state of the art Conference Center with multiple breakout rooms, and the six thousand (6,000) square foot Corporate Training and Executive Conference Center. Included in the Conference Center is a fully equipped E-Conference Room with videoconferencing as well as teleconferencing capability.

An ideal venue for concerts, family shows, sporting events, conferences, conventions, trade shows, corporate seminars and much more, the Kovalchick Complex is projected to have a $22 million economic impact on the region during construction and an annual economic impact of $12.5 million in each year of operation.

The complex is named in honor of the Kovalchick Family, of Indiana, PA, who donated $2 million for the facility's construction.

Groundbreaking ceremonies for the Kovalchick Complex took place November 13, 2008, and included an announcement of a challenge grant for $1 million for the facility from Indiana University of Pennsylvania graduate Chad Hurley, co-founder of YouTube, in honor of Indiana University of Pennsylvania music professor and track and field coach Ed Fry. The arena portion of the Kovalchick Complex is named after Fry in honor of Hurley's gift. The Ed Fry Arena will be home to the IUP Men's and Women's Basketball teams and the IUP Women's Volleyball Team, a wide variety of concerts, family shows, trade shows, and much more.

Opening
Early events scheduled after the opening of the arena included the Harlem Globetrotters and the Ringling Bros. and Barnum & Bailey Circus. Ticket sales for the March 10, 2011 show by the Globetrotters set the group's record for most sales in a week for a venue with a capacity of 5,000 or less. In addition to the Globetrotters and Circus, performances in the first months of operation included Waka Flocka Flame, Thirty Seconds to Mars with Anberlin, Widespread Panic, Steve Miller Band with Gregg Allman, Kenny Rogers, WWE Wrestling, Stone Temple Pilots, and comedians Rob Riggle and Steve Byrne.

References

External links

IUP Crimson Hawks
Sports venues in Pennsylvania